Dhaarahwa is a village in West Champaran district in the Indian state of Bihar.

Demographics
As of 2011 India census, Dhaarahwa had a population of 1622 in 274 households. Males constitute 50.73% of the population and females 49.26%. Dhaarahwa has an average literacy rate of 32.55%, lower than the national average of 74%: male literacy is 61.5%, and female literacy is 38.4%. In Dhaarahwa, 25.27% of the population is under 6 years of age.

References

Villages in West Champaran district